José E. Almeida is a Brazilian businessman. He has served as the chairman and CEO of  Baxter International, Inc. since January 2016. He worked for Tyco Healthcare from 1995 to 2002. He was president of Medical Devices division from October 2006 to June 2011. He served as chairman of the board of directors of Covidien since March 2012 and as the president, chief executive officer and a director since July 2011. He became a director of EMC Corporation on Jan 12, 2015 and resigned on October 30, 2015, due to his election as chairman and CEO of Baxter. In 2015, he worked for The Carlyle Group as an Operating Executive in the Global Healthcare group.

A native of Brazil, Almeida received a Bachelor of Science in mechanical engineering from Escola de Engenharia Mauá in São Paulo. He currently serves on the board of directors of the Advanced Medical Technology Association (AdvaMed) and Partners in Health, and he is a member of Business Roundtable.

References

American technology executives
American health care chief executives
Living people
Baxter International people
Tyco International
Year of birth missing (living people)